Goodbye Sousa is a Canadian short documentary film, directed by Tony Ianzelo and released in 1973. It profiles the Newmarket Citizens' Band, one of Canada's oldest active marching bands.

The film won the Canadian Film Award for Best Theatrical Short Film at the 25th Canadian Film Awards in 1971.

References

External links
 
 Goodbye Sousa at the National Film Board of Canada

1973 films
Best Theatrical Short Film Genie and Canadian Screen Award winners
Canadian short documentary films
1973 short films
National Film Board of Canada short films
Films directed by Tony Ianzelo
Films shot in Ontario
1970s English-language films
1970s Canadian films